Laura Drake Gill (born Aug. 24, 1860, Chesterville, Maine, U.S. – died Feb. 3, 1926, Berea, Kentucky) was the third dean of Barnard College.

She graduated in 1881 from Smith College with a degree in mathematics. She became an educator, in particular the third dean of Barnard College. In 1898, she left for Cuba among the first group of nurses sent by the Red Cross. According to Britannica, she is "remembered particularly for her role in establishing organized placement assistance for educated women".

References

1860 births
1926 deaths
Smith College alumni
Educators from Maine
American women educators
Barnard College faculty
American academic administrators
People from Franklin County, Maine
Women heads of universities and colleges